Royal Sundaram General Insurance Co. Ltd. (formerly known as Royal Sundaram Alliance Insurance Company Limited), a subsidiary of Sundaram Finance Group, is the first private sector general insurance company in India to be licensed in October 2000 by the Insurance Regulatory and Development Authority of India.

The company was initially promoted as a joint venture between Sundaram Finance, one of the most respected non-banking financial institutions (NBFCs) in India and Royal & SunAlliance Insurance plc, UK, one of the oldest general insurers in the UK.  In July 2015, Sundaram Finance acquired the 26% equity holding from Royal & SunAlliance Insurance plc. Consequently, the entire 100% equity holding is now held by Sundaram Finance (75.90%) and other Indian shareholders (24.10%).

Car Insurance 
Car insurance reimburses the financial losses incurred during accidents or natural calamities such as earthquake, storm, typhoon, man-made calamities, fire, and explosion. The insured get reimbursement of up to the Insured’s Declared Value (IDV) of the vehicle. Apart from personal accident cover, third-party property damage and free road-side assistance (RSA) is also provided.

Health Insurance 
Royal Sundaram provides assorted health insurance plans to fulfill the different healthcare needs of various individuals. Both individual and family floater plans are provided to cater to the complete medical care needs of different individuals.

1. Lifeline Health Insurance Plan – A comprehensive health insurance policy with a family floater option that covers medical expenses arising out of unforeseen hospitalization due to any accident or illness, for self, spouse, and dependent children. The policy has several benefits such as reload benefit, AYUSH treatment, emergency domestic evacuation, worldwide emergency hospitalization and international treatment for 11 critical illnesses.

2. Smart Cash Plan – A health insurance plan that provides a daily cash benefit for planned and emergency hospitalization for family and legally related individuals of the proposer arising out of any unforeseen accident or illness.

3. Arogya Sanjeevani Plan -  One of best priced ASP products in the market (ASP is a common product across all general health insurance companies in India).

4.  Family Health Plan- With Maternity coverage and one policy for entire family is its highlight which is very good plan for newly wedded couple who do not have maternity coverage and planning for maternity after 3 years and also where a big joint family requiring single policy coverage for all its family members.

5.  Lifeline Convertible Top Up policy- One of the best in the industry where the top up policy can be converted to base policy after even 1 year or whenever required, it is useful for those who are covered by Group health policy and when they retire or during any break in employment the policy can be converted to base policy from TOP UP policy.

Travel Insurance 
It is an all-inclusive insurance policy that offers coverage against medical emergencies and travel hazards such as loss of luggage and travel documents, delay in flights, and cancellation. Any infant of more than three months of age and any adult up to 70 years of age can be insured for trips taken outside India. Two plans are available:

1. Single Trip travel Insurance
Offers cover from the time of departure to the day of arrival in India. Cover for a period of 180 days is available.

2. Multi-Trip Travel Insurance
Offers cover for multiple international trips.

Home Insurance 
Royal Sundaram Home Insurance offers protection against natural and man-made calamities and threats such as burglary. The company has designed two different policies:

1. Home Shield Insurance
It offers complete cover for home, residential building, and even the compound walls. It also covers the reconstruction cost of the home after damage.

2. Home Content Insurance
Offer reimbursement of up to ₹11.5 lakhs for home appliances, furniture, jewellery, and other valuable items placed at home.

Two Wheeler Insurance 
The two-wheeler insurance policy provides complete protection to two-wheelers and can be purchased online. It safeguards against any kind of damage incurred due to accidents or natural calamities. The policy cover is extended to any two-wheeler, its accessories, damages caused to third-party, and any injury to life.

Awards and recognition
 2014 Celent recognition for developing an intelligent claims management system to improve the productivity of the staff and increase customer satisfaction 
 2013 Celent recognition for having a Model Insurer Asia component in the area of Distribution/New Business 
 2011 Celent recognition for implementing a work flow enabled policy administration system with externalised engines
 Won the Information week Edge Award for several e-application implementation projects

See also
 List of insurance companies in India
 Insurance in India
 Oppenheimer Holdings

References

External links
  

General insurance companies of India
Financial services companies established in 2000
Financial services companies based in Chennai
TVS Group
2000 establishments in Tamil Nadu
Indian companies established in 2000